This article displays the qualifying draw of the 2011 Open de Moselle.

Players

Seeds

  Mischa Zverev (qualifying competition)
  Igor Sijsling (qualified)
  Conor Niland (first round)
  Jonathan Dasnières de Veigy (qualified)
  Michael Ryderstedt (qualifying competition)
  Mathieu Rodrigues (qualified)
  Nicolas Renavand (qualified)
  Yann Marti (qualifying competition)

Qualifiers

  Mathieu Rodrigues
  Igor Sijsling
  Nicolas Renavand
  Jonathan Dasnières de Veigy

Qualifying draw

First qualifier

Second qualifier

Third qualifier

Fourth qualifier

References
 Qualifying Draw

qualifying